Bust of Martin Luther King or Martin Luther King bust or similar, may refer to:

 Bust of Martin Luther King Jr. (U.S. Capitol), Washington, D.C., USA
 Bust of Martin Luther King, Jr. (Jersey City), New Jersey, USA
 Bust of Martin Luther King Jr. (Alston), a bronze bust design by Charles Alston, of which several were cast

See also
 Statue of Martin Luther King (disambiguation)
 Martin Luther King (disambiguation)
 MLK (disambiguation)